Ouareau may refer to:

 Camp Ouareau, a vacation camp, in Notre-Dame-de-la-Merci, Quebec, Canada
 Lake Ouareau, in municipality of Saint-Donat, Quebec, Canada
 Ouareau River, Saint-Paul, Quebec, Canada
 Forêt-Ouareau Regional Park, a regional park in Matawinie, Lanaudière, Quebec, Canada